Asura luzonica is a moth of the family Erebidae. It is found on the Philippines (Luzon).

References

luzonica
Moths described in 1919
Moths of Asia